The Council of Ministers of the Republic of Colombia is composed of the most senior appointed politicians of the executive branch of the Government of Colombia. Members of the Cabinet are generally the heads of a Ministry Department. The existence of the Cabinet dates back to the first President Simon Bolivar.  These members were appointed in order to advise the President and are therefore required to assist him in his duties as stated by the Colombian Constitution.

Current Cabinet

The Cabinet of President Gustavo Petro.

History

19th century
In the Constitution of 1821, Simón Bolívar created a Cabinet composed of five secretariats:
 Secretariat of the Interior
 Secretariat of the Exterior
 Secretariat of War and Navy
 Secretariat of Finance and Public Credit
With time, areas of some secretariats were given to new institutions; in the mid-19th century, when the Secretariat of Trade was created, this deprived the Secretariat of the Exterior (then renamed Foreign Affairs) of that function.

In 1886, President Rafael Núñez changed their nomenclature from secretariats to ministries, and created new ones, so, in the beginning of the 20th century, after the Thousand Days War, the Council of ministers was composed of:
 Ministry of the Government
 Ministry of Justice
 Ministry of Foreign Affairs
 Ministry of War
 Ministry of Finance
 Ministry of the Treasury
 1894 - The Ministry of Justice is disbanded.
The Secretary of Trade disappeared; its assignments were transferred to the Vice Ministry of Development, under the control of the Minister of Finance.

20th century
1990's
 1991 - The Ministry of Foreign Trade is created.
 1992 - The Ministry of Public Works and Transport is renamed Ministry of Transport.
 1993 - The Ministry of Justice is renamed Ministry of Justice and Law.
 1993 - The Ministry of Environment is created.
 1996 - The Ministry of Government is renamed the Ministry of the Interior.
 1997 - The Ministry of Culture is created.
Ministries by the end of the 20th Century
 Ministry of the Interior
 Ministry of Finance and Public Credit
 Ministry of Justice and Law
 Ministry of National Defence
 Ministry of Health and Social Security
 Ministry of Labour
 Ministry of Agriculture and Rural Development
 Ministry of Foreign Trade
 Ministry of National Education
 Ministry of Mines and Energy
 Ministry of Transport
 Ministry of Communications
 Ministry of Environment
 Ministry of Economic Development
 Ministry of Culture

21st Century
2000's
During the first administration of President Álvaro Uribe, Congress and the President passed Law 790 of 2002, which modified the existing ministries by merging and reducing their number to 13. In accordance with Article 7, the Ministries in order and precedence were then thus:
 Ministry of the Interior and Justice
 Merging the Ministry of Justice and Law with the Ministry of the Interior.
 Ministry of Foreign Affairs
 Ministry of Finance and Public Credit
 Ministry of National Defense
 Ministry of Agriculture and Rural Development
 Ministry of Social Protection
 Merging the Ministry of Labour and Social Security with the Ministry of Health.
 Ministry of Mines and Energy
 Ministry of Commerce, Industry and Tourism
 Merging the Ministry of Foreign Trade with the Ministry of Economic Development.
 Ministry of National Education
 Ministry of Environment, Housing and Territorial Development
 The Ministry of the Environment is enhanced and assigned matters of potable water, land use, sanitation, and rural development.
 Ministry of Communications
 Ministry of Transport
 Ministry of Culture
 2009 - Passed on July 30, 2009, Law 1341 of 2009 redefined the Ministry of Communications and transformed it into the Ministry of Information Technologies and Communications.
2010's
 2011 - The Ministry of the Interior and Justice is once again divided into the Ministry of the Interior and Ministry of Justice and Law.
 2011 - The Ministry of Environment, Housing and Territorial Development is divided into the Ministry of Environment and Sustainable Development and the Ministry of Housing, City and Territory.
 2011 - The Ministry of Social Protection is divided into the Ministry of Labour and the Ministry of Health and Social Protection.

Timeline of the Council of Ministers 

Abbreviations used: Agr./Liv. - Agriculture and Livestock; Env./Hous./Terr. - Environment, housing and territorial development; Ind./Lab. - Industry and Labour; ICT - Information and communication technologies; Lab./Hyg./Soc. - Labour, hygiene and social protection.

References

Government of Colombia
Government ministries of Colombia
National cabinets